Ann Kathleen Corcoran (born 21 September 1951) is a former Australian politician. She was a member of the House of Representatives from 2000 to 2007, representing the Victorian seat of Isaacs for the Australian Labor Party (ALP). She was an accountant prior to entering politics.

Early life
Corcoran was born on 21 September 1951 in Dandenong, Victoria. Her father Robert Corcoran, a published author, was a prominent figure in the ALP split of 1955, giving evidence to the Federal Executive in favour of federal leader H.V. Evatt.

Corcoran is a member of CPA Australia and holds a diploma in business studies from Swinburne College of Technology and a graduate diploma in business from Monash University. Prior to entering parliament she held managerial positions in accounting as finance, including deputy manager of general accounting at the University of Melbourne (1988–1992), management accountant at Frankston Hospital (1992–1995), deputy director of finance at Royal Melbourne Hospital (1995–1996), business manager at Kilvington Grammar School (1996–1999), and business manager at Woodleigh School, Melbourne (1999).

Politics
Corcoran was elected to parliament at the 2000 Isaacs by-election, caused by the death by suicide of the incumbent Labor MP Greg Wilton. She was re-elected at the 2001 and 2004 federal elections.

In parliament, Corcoran served two terms on the speaker's panel and was a member of several parliamentary committees. She was a shadow parliamentary secretary from 2004 to 2006  under opposition leaders of Mark Latham and Kim Beazley, assisting the shadow ministers for health and immigration. She reportedly voted for Latham against Beazley in the December 2003 leadership election.

In March 2006, Corcoran was successfully challenged for preselection by Mark Dreyfus. Her term ended prior to the 2007 federal election.

Later life
Corcoran became interim student ombudsman at Monash University in November 2007 and was appointed to the permanent position by the university council in early 2009.

References

1951 births
Living people
Australian Labor Party members of the Parliament of Australia
Members of the Australian House of Representatives
Members of the Australian House of Representatives for Isaacs
Monash University alumni
Australian accountants
Women members of the Australian House of Representatives
21st-century Australian politicians
21st-century Australian women politicians
20th-century Australian politicians
20th-century Australian women politicians
People from Dandenong, Victoria
Politicians from Melbourne